State Route 139 (SR 139) is a  state highway in the northeastern part of the U.S. state of Georgia. It travels within portions of Clayton, Fulton, and Cobb counties and connects the southern suburbs of Atlanta with the town of Mableton, west of the city.

Route description

SR 139 begins at an intersection with SR 85 in the southern part of the town of Riverdale, in Clayton County. It heads northwest to the city of College Park. In the town, it first has an interchange with Interstate 285 (I-285). The highway intersects SR 314 (West Fayetteville Road) and then runs along the southwestern part of the Hartsfield–Jackson Atlanta International Airport. Then, it has an interchange with I-85. Immediately after this interchange is the Fulton County line. Shortly afterward, the highway passes over, but does not intersect US 29/SR 14. It continues northwest and turns to the north at Jamestown Park. At SR 6 (Camp Creek Parkway), they run concurrently to the east. Then, they enter Fulton County again and intersect US 29/SR 14. SR 139 joins their concurrency. To the northeast, they pass through East Point, where they have an interchange with SR 154/SR 166 (Arthur B. Langford Jr. Parkway), just before they enter Atlanta and pass Fort McPherson. At this interchange, SR 154 joins the concurrency. They pass through the Oakland City neighborhood before SR 139 departs to the west on Ralph David Abernathy Boulevard. After leaving the concurrency, it passes through the West End neighborhood. Then, it passes just north of Westview Cemetery, before intersecting with SR 280 (Hamilton E. Holmes Drive NW), at which point the road becomes known as Martin Luther King Jr. Drive. A short distance later is a second interchange with I-285, the neighborhood of Adamsville. After that, it passes under, but does not have an interchange with I-20 (Tom Murphy Freeway). Just northwest of I-20 is SR 70 (Fulton Industrial Boulevard NW) and Fulton County Airport–Brown Field. The road crosses over the Chattahoochee River into Cobb County. It passes through rural areas until it meets its northern terminus, an intersection with US 78/US 278/SR 8 (Veterans Memorial Highway SW), in Mableton.

SR 139 is not part of the National Highway System.

Major intersections

See also

References

External links

 Georgia Roads (Routes 121 - 140)

139
Transportation in Clayton County, Georgia
Transportation in Fulton County, Georgia
Transportation in Cobb County, Georgia
Roads in Atlanta
College Park, Georgia